Watkin William Shone (born 1857; date of death unknown), commonly known as William Shone, was a Welsh footballer who played as a forward and made one appearance for the Wales national team.

Career
Shone made his first and only international appearance for Wales on 18 January 1879 in a friendly against England. The away match, which was played in Lambeth, finished as a 1–2 loss for Wales.

Career statistics

International

References

External links
 
 

1857 births
Association football forwards
Date of birth missing
Oswestry Town F.C. players
Wales international footballers
Welsh footballers
Year of death missing